Decinea is a Neotropical genus of skippers in the family Hesperiidae.

Species
Recognised species in the genus Decinea include:
Decinea antus (Mabille, 1895)
Decinea colombiana Grishin, 2022)
Decinea dama (Herrich-Schäffer, 1869)
Decinea denta Evans, 1955
Decinea decinea (Hewitson, 1876)
Decinea huasteca (Freeman, 1969)
Decinea lucifer (Hübner, [1831])
Decinea mammaea (Hewitson, 1876)
Decinea milesi (Weeks, 1901)
Decinea mustea Freeman, 1979
Decinea neroides (Herrich-Schäffer, 1869)
Decinea percosius (Godman, [1900])
Decinea rindgei Freeman, 1969
Decinea zapota Evans, 1955

References

Natural History Museum Lepidoptera genus database
Decinea at funet

Hesperiini
Hesperiidae genera